Europa TV was a consortium of five European public service broadcasters from West Germany (ARD), Ireland (RTÉ), Italy (RAI), the Netherlands (NOS) and Portugal (RTP).

History

Development
This aspired to be pan-European not only with regard to its geographical reach but also its programming content. It came after the Eurikon experiment that consisted on the production of an experimental television service which over a period of five weeks, was distributed in closed-circuit format.

Europa TV was financed through contributions from the Dutch government, the European Commission, the participating broadcast organizations and through advertising revenues within its initial three-year budget was 30 million ECUs.

Operation
Europa TV started its transmissions on 5 October 1985 and initially only available in the Netherlands, which expanded its reach to 4.5 million households across Europe via ESA and Eutelsat's ECS-1 satellite. This included access to 1.5 million households in Portugal where it was transmitted terrestrially on RTP2 (in other countries that the signal was also distributed by cable).

To overcome language barriers, Europa TV transmitted on several sound channels within facilities for simultaneous translation (in English, Dutch, German and Portuguese) enabled audiences to receive the channel in their native tongue. In addition, subtitling in different languages was provided through teletext.

Closure
On 29 November 1986, it was forced to cease operations having already exhausted its initial three-year budget.

See also
 List of European television stations
 International broadcasting
 Arte
 BBC TV Europe
 Euronews
 Eurosport
 Music Box
 NBC Europe (formerly Super Channel)
 Screensport
 Sky Television

References

Television channels and stations established in 1985
Multilingual broadcasters
Publicly funded broadcasters
European Broadcasting Union members
1980s in Europe
 
German-language television networks
Television stations in Germany
1980s in German television
English-language television stations
Raidió Teilifís Éireann
1980s in Irish television
Rai (broadcaster)
Italian-language television networks
1980s in Italian television
Dutch public broadcasting organisations
Netherlands Public Broadcasting
Dutch-language television networks
1980s in Dutch television
Rádio e Televisão de Portugal
Portuguese-language television networks
1980s in Portuguese television